Spanioptila is a genus of moths in the family Gracillariidae.

Species
Spanioptila codicaria Meyrick, 1920
Spanioptila eucnemis Walsingham, 1914
Spanioptila nemeseta Meyrick, 1920
Spanioptila spinosum Walsingham, 1897

External links
Global Taxonomic Database of Gracillariidae (Lepidoptera)

Gracillariinae
Gracillarioidea genera